Steffani Ethel Otiniano Torres (born 7 August 1992) is a Peruvian professional footballer who plays as a forward for Brazilian Série A1 club AS Minas ICESP and the Peru women's national team.

International goals
Scores and results list Peru's goal tally first

References

1992 births
Living people
People from Iquitos
Peruvian women's footballers
Women's association football wingers
Women's association football midfielders
Associação Portuguesa de Desportos players
Esporte Clube Taubaté players
Club Universitario de Deportes footballers
Campeonato Brasileiro de Futebol Feminino Série A1 players
Peru women's international footballers
Pan American Games competitors for Peru
Footballers at the 2019 Pan American Games
Peruvian expatriate footballers
Peruvian expatriate sportspeople in Brazil
Expatriate women's footballers in Brazil
21st-century Peruvian women